Giachetti is an Italian surname. It may refer to:

Fosco Giachetti (1900–1974), Italian actor
Gianfranco Giachetti (1888–1936), Italian stage and film actor
Jacopo Giachetti (born 1983), Italian basketball player
Richard Giachetti, NASCAR race car owner and one half of the Giachetti Brothers
Richie Giachetti (1940–2016), American boxing trainer 
Roberto Giachetti (born 1961), Italian politician